The Ministry of Agriculture, Fisheries and Water Resource is the governmental body in the Sultanate of Oman responsible for all matters relating to agriculture, fisheries and water resources.

Function 
The competences of MoAFWR are as follows: 
Setting and implementing the policies for the development and exploitation of agricultural, livestock, and living water resources.
Preparing the draft laws and regulations related to the management and exploitation of agricultural, livestock, and fisheries.
Developing investment in the fields of agriculture, livestock and fisheries.
Conducting research and studies in the field of agriculture, livestock and fisheries.
Preparing and implementing training programs for farmers, fishermen, and livestock breeders.
Developing the field of irrigation and the development of agricultural lands.
Protecting agricultural and livestock resources from diseases.
Protecting live water resources from harmful exploitation.
Promoting and supporting aquaculture.
Preparing and implementing agricultural, livestock and fisheries safety programs.
Administering agricultural and fisheries marketing.
Establishing and developing fishing ports.
Developing the international relations of Oman with other countries in the fields of agriculture, livestock and live water resource, and representing the Sultanate at international venues relating to this area.
Training its staff to undertake the responsibilities of the ministry.

References

External links 
 Ministry of Agriculture and Fisheries

Government of Oman